The dollar was the currency of the Raj of Sarawak from 1858 to 1953. It was subdivided into 100 cents. The dollar remained at par with the Straits dollar and its successor the Malayan dollar, the currency of Malaya and Singapore, from its introduction until both currencies were replaced by the Malaya and British Borneo dollar in 1953.

During the Japanese occupation period (1942–1945), paper money was issued in denominations ranging from 1 cent to 1,000 dollars. This currency was fixed at 1 dollar = 1 Japanese yen, compared to a 1:2 pre-war rate. Following the war, the Japanese occupation currency was declared worthless and the previous issues of the Sarawakian dollar regained their value relative to sterling (two shillings four pence).

Coins 

All Sarawak coins carry the portrait and the name of one of the three "White Rajahs" of Sarawak, James Brooke until 1868, Charles Brooke from 1868 to 1917, and Charles Vyner Brooke from 1917 to the end of this currency in 1938. Throughout the history of the Sarawak dollar, coins were minted in values of  cent,  cent, 1 cent, 5 cents, 10 cents, 20 cents, and 50 cents. The copper  was the smallest denomination and the first to be discontinued, last being issued in 1896. The  was also always copper and after reductions in size was eventually discontinued in 1933. Starting in 1892 1 cent coins had a hole in the centre, but the holed design was discontinued after 1897.

In 1920 the 1 cent coin was struck in copper-nickel but later reverted to bronze in 1927. The 5 and 10 cent coins were 80% silver until 1920, when they were briefly reduced to 40% silver and then replaced by copper-nickel the same year. The 20 and 50 cent coins remained silver but in 1920 were reduced from 80% to 40%.

Banknotes 
The first series was issued by the Sarawak Government Treasury. They were hand-stamped notes of low quality.  All later notes were issued by the Government of Sarawak except for the 10-cent and 25-cent notes in 1919 (by the Treasury again). Throughout its history, banknotes came in the values of 5 cents, 10 cents, 20 cents, 25 cents, 50 cents, $1, $5, $10, $25, $50, and $100.

See also 
 British North Borneo dollar

References

External links 
 Coins from Sarawak

1858 establishments in Sarawak
1953 disestablishments
Currencies of Malaysia
Currencies of the British Empire
Dollar
Raj of Sarawak
Modern obsolete currencies
Obsolete currencies in Malaysian history